The Emavulandlela Swaziland Scout Association (formerly the Swaziland Boy Scouts Association) is the national Scouting organization of Eswatini (Swaziland). The boys-only organization was founded in 1924, and became a member of the World Organization of the Scout Movement in 1968. In 2009, there were 6,850 members.

The association is divided into four districts: Hhohho, Lubombo, Manzini and Shishelweni.

Ideals and method

The Scout Motto is Hlala ulungele! in siSwati. The highest rank is Lion Scout.

Scout Promise in English and siSwati
On my honour, I promise to do my best,
To do my duty to God, the King,
To help other people at all times
And to keep the Scout Law.

Ngekwetsembeka kwami,
Ngiyetsembisa kutsi ngitawenta konkhe lokusemandleni ami,
kusebentela Nkulunkulu, neNkhosi yakaNgwane, 
kusita bantfu ngaso sonkhe sikhatsi, 
nekugcina umtsetfo weMavulandlela.

Scout Laws
A Scout is to be trusted 
A Scout is loyal 
A Scout is friendly and considerate 
A Scout is a brother to all Scouts 
A Scout has courage to all difficulties 
A Scout make good use of his time and is careful of possessions and property 
A Scout has respect for himself and for others

See also
Eswatini Girl Guides Association
Lesotho Scouts Association
Scouts South Africa

References

External links
Official website

World Organization of the Scout Movement member organizations
Scouting and Guiding in Eswatini
Youth organizations established in 1924